Martti Juhkami (born 6 June 1988) is an Estonian volleyball player, a member of the Estonia men's national volleyball team and Czech club ČEZ Karlovarsko.

Estonian national team

On October 24, 2011 was appointed to the Estonian national team by head coach Avo Keel. He debuted in senior team on November 18, 2011. It was a friendly match against Latvia (3–2) in Kuressaare, Estonia where he scored 13 points.

As a member of the senior Estonia men's national volleyball team, Juhkami competed at the 2015 and 2019 Men's European Volleyball Championships.

Sporting achievements

Clubs
MEVZA Cup
  2014/2015 – with Hypo Tirol Innsbruck
  2016/2017 – with Hypo Tirol Innsbruck

Baltic League
  2009/2010 – with Pere Leib Tartu
  2011/2012 – with Pere Leib Tartu
  2021/2022 – with Bigbank Tartu

National championship
 2009/2010  Estonian Championship, with Pere Leib Tartu
 2010/2011  Estonian Championship, with Pere Leib Tartu
 2011/2012  Estonian Championship, with Pere Leib Tartu
 2012/2013  Estonian Championship, with Selver Tallinn
 2013/2014  German Championship, with TV Bühl
 2014/2015  Austrian Championship, with Hypo Tirol Innsbruck
 2016/2017  Austrian Championship, with Hypo Tirol Innsbruck
 2020/2021  German Championship, with VfB Friedrichshafen
 2021/2022  Estonian Championship, with Bigbank Tartu

National cup
 2011/2012  Estonian Cup, with Pere Leib Tartu
 2012/2013  Estonian Cup, with Selver Tallinn
 2015/2016  French Cup, with Rennes Volley 35
 2017/2018  French Cup, with Tourcoing VB
 2019/2020  German SuperCup, with VfB Friedrichshafen
 2021/2022  Estonian Cup, with Bigbank Tartu
 2022/2023  Czech SuperCup, with ČEZ Karlovarsko

Individual
 2012 Baltic League – Best Opposite Hitter
 2013 Baltic League – Best Server
 2016 French Ligue B – Best Outside Hitter
 2020 Estonian Volleyball Player of the Year
 2022 Estonian League – Best Outside Hitter
 2022 Czech SuperCup – Most Valuable Player

References

External links

1988 births
Living people
Estonian men's volleyball players
Estonian expatriate volleyball players
Expatriate volleyball players in Germany
Expatriate volleyball players in Austria
Expatriate volleyball players in France
Estonian expatriate sportspeople in Germany
Estonian expatriate sportspeople in Austria
Estonian expatriate sportspeople in France
Sportspeople from Rakvere
Expatriate volleyball players in the Czech Republic
Estonian expatriate sportspeople in the Czech Republic